WQJQ (100.3 FM, "Magic 100.3") was a 100-watt radio station broadcasting an adult contemporary music format simulcasting co-owned WGMT and was licensed to Barton, Vermont, United States. The station was owned by Michael Percy, through licensee Capital Broadcasting Associates, LLC.

History
WJPK signed on in September 2008 as a simulcast of country-formatted WKXH 105.5 FM. In September 2009, the station changed to a simulcast of adult contemporary-formatted WGMT 97.7 FM, then to a bluegrass format in late 2012.

On December 1, 2011, WJPK changed its call letters to WJJZ and on August 16, 2012, changed the call letters to WQJQ. In November 2012, Vermont Broadcast Associates reached a deal to sell WQJQ to Michael Percy's Capital Broadcasting Associates. The sale, at a price of $25,000, was consummated on December 28, 2012.

WQJQ surrendered its license to the Federal Communications Commission on January 19, 2022. At the time of the shutdown, it had been simulcasting WGMT.

References

External links

97.7 WGMT on Facebook

QJQ
Radio stations established in 2008
2008 establishments in Vermont
Radio stations disestablished in 2022
2022 disestablishments in Vermont
Defunct radio stations in the United States
QJQ